Pomeroy a small town in KwaZulu-Natal, South Africa.

Town some 72 km north of Greytown and 56 km south-south-east of Dundee. The town was named Pomeroy after Sir George Pomeroy Colley who led the ill-fated British force during the Battle of Majuba Hill in 1881.

It was established as the Gordon Memorial Mission in 1867 in memory of James Henry Hamilton-Gordon, the son of George Hamilton-Gordon, 5th Earl of Aberdeen. The mission worked with the Zulus.

Pomeroy was further developed by the Boodhoo family, first 2 stores by late Mr Boodhoo who was succeeded by Herman Boodhoo who further established a Toy Manufacturing shop & first supermarkets, Boodhoo Bros and Boodhoo & Sons, was then succeeded by Puren Boodhoo who was a strong political figure, business man farmer and sportsman, Golf and Tennis, supporting & hosting the local community sports. Was then succeeded by Rambally Boodhoo  who also furthered the business which strongly supporting the town growth also a strong sportsman in Golf & Tennis, Captain of the Tennis team. He was succeeded by Dan Boodhoo who was a great entrepreneur. The town is still held together by the supermarket's and stores built by the great Boodhoo Dynasty.

References

Populated places in the Msinga Local Municipality
Populated places established in 1867